Springbrook may refer to:

Places

Australia
 Springbrook, Queensland
 Springbrook National Park, Queensland
 Springbrook State School, a heritage-listed building in the park
 Springbrook Road, a heritage-listed road

Canada
 Springbrook, Alberta
 Springbrook, a community in Stirling-Rawdon, Ontario
 Springbrook, Prince Edward Island

United States
 Springbrook, Iowa
 Springbrook, North Dakota
 Springbrook, Oregon
 Springbrook, Wisconsin, a town
 Springbrook (community), Wisconsin, an unincorporated community
 Springbrook Airport, Jackson County, Oregon
 Springbrook High School, Silver Spring, Maryland
 Springbrook Nature Center, Fridley, Minnesota
 Springbrook State Park, Guthrie County, Iowa

Other uses
 Springbrook (organization), a non-profit organization in Oneonta, New York, US

See also
 Spring Brook (disambiguation)